is a Japanese football player, who will play as Forward and currently play for JFL club, Tiamo Hirakata.

Club career
After attending the football team section of the Kansai University, Reo Takeshita joined Nagano Parceiro in December 2017.

In 2020, Takeshita joined JFL club MIO Biwako Shiga. He left the club on 2022, after the expiration of his two-year contract with the club.

In 2022, Takeshita joined JFL club Tiamo Hirakata for the upcoming 2023 season.

Personal life
Born in Shizuoka. He is brazilian descent through Brazilian mother.

Career statistics

Club
.

References

External links

Profile at J. League
Profile at AC Nagano Parceiro

1995 births
Living people
Kansai University alumni
Association football people from Shizuoka Prefecture
Japanese footballers
Japanese people of Brazilian descent
J3 League players
Japan Football League players
AC Nagano Parceiro players
MIO Biwako Shiga players
FC Tiamo Hirakata players
Association football forwards